The coat of arms of Kotor is an official insignia of Kotor, coastal town in Montenegro. This is a new Coat of Arms, adopted on 16 February 2009. It is designed by Srđan Marlović, who also designed the Coat of arms of Podgorica and that of Bar.

Description of the coat of arms

The Coat of Arms consists of the silver shield, divided into three fields. These three fields contain:

 The figure of Saint Tryphon
 A stone tower, complete with merlons, oculus and a door.
 A lion in a salient position.

The shield is topped with the golden wall crown with three merlons, and is surrounded by the golden lions as supporters, and with green Bay Laurel twig and a golden banner at the bottom. The banner reads COMMUNITAS CIVITATIS CATHARI (Which is the name for the Kotor municipality in Latin, as a homage to history and age of Kotor). The banner has a golden obverse, and a red reverse.

The Flag of Kotor is two-colored, with small Coat of Arms in a medallion placed in the middle of the field. The hoist of the Flag is white, while the fly is red. In the center of the flag, a small medallion Coat of Arms is placed, defined by the golden scroll.

Kotor
Kotor
Kotor
Kotor
Kotor